Laionel Silva Ramalho (born 27 April 1986), known simply as Laionel, is a Brazilian footballer who plays for Associação Atlética Portuguesa (Santos) as a forward.

Club career
Born in Campos Belos, Goiás, Laionel started playing football with two local clubs, lowly Vila Nova Futebol Clube and Grêmio Esportivo Inhumense. In the middle of 2007, he moved to Portugal with Boavista FC.

After Boavista's demotion due to irregularities, Laionel stayed in the country, signing with another modest side in the Primeira Liga, Vitória de Setúbal, for the 2008–09 campaign. Again, he struggled to find the net even though he received a fair amount of playing time, but his team avoided a drop this time.

Laionel was loaned to Spain's UD Salamanca in summer 2009, with the Segunda División club retaining a €175.000 buying option at the season's close. As the Castile and León team barely avoided relegation he did not manage to score in the league, appearing in less than half of the matches.

In early July 2010, Laionel returned to Portugal, being loaned to Académica de Coimbra from Grémio Anápolis (formerly Inhumense), in a season-long move. On 15 August he scored his first official goal in more than one year, netting from 35 metres in the 93rd minute to help shock-defeat title holders S.L. Benfica 2–1 away from home.

On 11 July 2011, Laionel moved to freshly promoted club Gil Vicente F.C. after his contract with Grêmio expired. On 12 August, in the campaign opener, again he stripped Benfica of points, scoring once to help the Barcelos team come from behind 0–2 to earn a point at home; in late January 2012, however, he signed for FC Astra Ploiești in Romania.

References

External links

1986 births
Living people
Sportspeople from Goiás
Brazilian footballers
Association football forwards
Campeonato Brasileiro Série B players
Campeonato Brasileiro Série C players
Campeonato Brasileiro Série D players
Vila Nova Futebol Clube players
Grêmio Esportivo Anápolis players
Clube do Remo players
Sociedade Esportiva do Gama players
Guarani FC players
Volta Redonda FC players
Associação Atlética Luziânia players
Villa Nova Atlético Clube players
Associação Atlética Portuguesa (Santos) players
Primeira Liga players
Boavista F.C. players
Vitória F.C. players
Associação Académica de Coimbra – O.A.F. players
Gil Vicente F.C. players
Segunda División players
UD Salamanca players
Liga I players
FC Astra Giurgiu players
Brazilian expatriate footballers
Expatriate footballers in Portugal
Expatriate footballers in Spain
Expatriate footballers in Romania
Brazilian expatriate sportspeople in Portugal
CE Operário Várzea-Grandense players